Joseph Jack (born 24 July 1953) is a Vincentian cricketer. He played in two first-class and nine List A matches for the Windward Islands from 1979 to 1982.

See also
 List of Windward Islands first-class cricketers

References

External links
 

1953 births
Living people
Saint Vincent and the Grenadines cricketers
Windward Islands cricketers